{{Infobox election
| election_name = 2022 Merton London Borough Council election
| type = parliamentary
| party_colour = 
| previous_election = 2018 Merton London Borough Council election
| previous_year = 2018
| election_date = 5 May 2022
| next_election = 2026 Merton London Borough Council election
| next_year = 2026
| seats_for_election = All 57 council seats on Merton London Borough Council

 |
 image1 = 
| colour1 = 
| party1 = Labour Party (UK)
| leader1 = Mark Allison
| leaders_seat1 = Wandle (defeated)
| last_election1 = 34 seats, 46.9%
| seats1 = 31
| seat_change1 = 3
| popular_vote1 = 70,423| percentage1 = 42.3%| swing1 = 4.6%

| image2 = 
| colour2 = 
| party2 = Liberal Democrats (UK)
| leader2 = Anthony Fairclough
| leaders_seat2 = Wimbledon Town & Dundonald
| last_election2 = 6 seats, 14.6%
| seats2 = 17
| seat_change2 = 11
| popular_vote2 = 41,655
| percentage2 = 25.0%
| swing2 = 10.4%

| image4 = 
| colour4 = 
| party4 = Conservative Party (UK)
| leader4 = Nick McLean
| leaders_seat4 = Cannon Hill
| last_election4 = 17 seats, 31.5%
| seats4 = 7
| seat_change4 = 10
| popular_vote4 = 43,382
| percentage4 = 26.1%
| swing4 = 5.4%

 |
image5 = 
| colour5 = 
| party5 = Merton Park Ward Residents Association
| leader5 = Edward Foley
| leaders_seat5 = Merton Park
| last_election5 = 3 seats, 3.3%
| seats5 = 2
| seat_change5 = 1
| popular_vote5 = 3,576
| percentage5 = 2.1%
| swing5 = 1.2%

| title = Council leader
| posttitle = Council leader afterelection
| before_election = Mark Allison
| before_party = Labour Party (UK)
| after_election = Ross Garrod
| after_party = Labour Party (UK)
}}Elections for the London Borough of Merton''' were held on 5 May 2022 to elect all 57 members of Merton London Borough Council in England. The elections took place alongside local elections in the other London boroughs and elections to local authorities across the United Kingdom.

The 2022 election took place under new election boundaries, which reduced the number of councillors from 60 to 57. Labour remained the largest party following the election, winning 31 seats. For the first time in the council's history, the Liberal Democrats became the largest opposition party, winning 17 seats. The Conservatives, previously the largest opposition party, won seven seats.

Background 
Since its formation, Merton has variously been under Labour control, Conservative control and no overall control. In the previous council election in 2018, Labour and the Conservatives lost seats to the Liberal Democrats. Labour won 34 seats with 46.9% of the vote across the borough, while the Conservatives won 17 seats with 31.5% of the vote. The Liberal Democrats rose to six seats with 14.6% of the vote and the Merton Park Ward Independent Residents continued to hold three seats with 3.3% of the vote across the borough.

Council term 
In May 2019, Mark Kenny, a Labour councillor for Cannon Hill, resigned citing health reasons. A by-election to fill the seat was held in June 2019, which was won by the Liberal Democrat candidate Jenifer Gould. One of the Liberal Democrat councillors for West Barnes, Carl Quilliam, defected to the Labour Party in June 2020 citing the national leadership of Keir Starmer. In March 2021, Kelly Braund, a Labour councillor for St Helier, resigned because she was moving to Scotland. At the subsequent by-election, the seat was held for Labour by Helen Dollimore.

The Labour councillor Mark Allison succeeded Stephen Alambritis as leader of the council in November 2020.

Along with most other London boroughs, Merton was subject to a boundary review ahead of the 2022 election. The Local Government Boundary Commission for England concluded that the council should have 57 seats, falling from the previous 60 seats, and produced new election boundaries following a period of consultation.

Electoral process 
Merton, like other London borough councils, elects all of its councillors at once every four years. The election took place by multi-member first-past-the-post voting, with each ward being represented by two or three councillors. Electors had as many votes as there are councillors to be elected in their ward, with the top two or three being elected.

All registered electors (British, Irish, Commonwealth and European Union citizens) living in London aged 18 or over were entitled to vote in the election. People who lived at two addresses in different councils, such as university students with different term-time and holiday addresses, were entitled to be registered for and vote in elections in both local authorities. Voting in-person at polling stations took place from 7:00 to 22:00 on election day, and voters will be able to apply for postal votes or proxy votes in advance of the election.

Results

Due to the boundary changes, which reduced the number of seats from 60 to 57, reporting the gains/losses by party is not straightforward. The BBC used a calculation which takes into account the changes relative to the expected previous result under the new boundaries. These give: Labour -4, Liberal Democrats +12, Conservatives -8, Merton Park Independents: no change.

Council composition

Ward results

Abbey

Cannon Hill

Colliers Wood

Cricket Green

Figge's Marsh

Graveney

Hillside

Lavender Fields

Longthornton

Lower Morden

Merton Park

Pollards Hill

Ravensbury

Raynes Park

St Helier

Village

Wandle

West Barnes

Wimbledon Park

Wimbledon Town & Dundonald

References 

Council elections in the London Borough of Merton
Merton